Ellis Douek  (born 1934) is a British surgeon and cochlear implant pioneer.

Early life
He was born in Cairo, Egypt, in 1934, the son of Cesar Elie Douek and his wife Nelly Sassoon. His parents were both from Syrian-Jewish merchant families, and he grew up in Zamalek, Cairo, with his sister Claudia, and brother Zaki.

Career 

 Fellow of the Royal College of Surgeons
 Consultant Otologist, 1970–99, now Emeritus, Guy's Hospital
 Chairman, Hearing Research Group, 1974–99, Guy's Hospital
 Member Medical Research Council (United Kingdom) working party on Hearing Research, 1975
 Medical Research Council Representative to European Communities on Hearing Research 1980
 UK Representative to European Communities on Industrial Deafness 1983
 Dalby Prize for hearing research, Royal Society of Medicine, 1978

Cochlear implants 

"During the 1970s, a group in the United Kingdom, headed by Ellis Douek, began experimenting with an extracochlear electrode that was stationed on the promontory near the round window ... this device created a great deal of interest because it was judge to be the more conservative, less invasive, approach."

"In Britain ... [I]t all started in the early 1970s, soon after Ellis Douek's appointment to a senior ear, nose and throat post at London’s Guy's Hospital. The Department of Health, prompted by a deafened Member of Parliament active on behalf of the disabled (Jack Ashley, now Lord Ashley), suggested to Douek that his speciality was doing far too little on sensorineural deafness, and why didn't he do something in that area?"

Autobiographies 
Douek is the author of the autobiography A Middle Eastern Affair (2004) , and the medical memoir To Hear Again, To Sing Again (2022).

References 

Living people
1934 births
British surgeons
Egyptian emigrants to England
Egyptian Jews
Physicians from Cairo